The 1910 Glamorgan County Council election was the eighth contest for seats on this local authority in south Wales. It was preceded by the 1907 election and followed by the 1913 election.

Overview of the Result
As in most parts of Wales, the Liberal Party was once again triumphant and won a majority of the seats. The Conservatives made a further advance in the western part of the county where they also held on in a number of industrial wards where the influence of paternalism remained strong. A more striking factor was the advance of Labour candidates in several areas and there were also a number of Liberal members who were returned under a 'progressive' banner with support from the labour movement.

Boundary Changes
There were numerous boundary changes resulting from the secession of Merthyr Tydfil from Glamorgan to create a new County Borough. There were boundary changes at Maesteg, leading to the creation of a second seat.

Retiring Aldermen
All eleven retiring aldermen were Liberals, or Lib-Lab members as the Conservatives and their allies had been denied any seats on the aldermanic bench since 1901.

Contested Elections
Most seats were contested. In the western part of the county, industrialists standing as Conservatives continued to hold their found in some wards.

Aberdare, Mountain Ash and Merthyr districts
There were only two contested elections in the Aberdare district, and both were again more personal than political.

Bridgend and Maesteg districts
There were a number of contested elections in this area.

Swansea, Pontardawe and Port Talbot districts
In these areas the Conservatives again performed well, mainly at the expense of the Liberals.

Results

Aberaman

Aberavon
J.M. Smith held on to the seat he had held since 1889, increasing his majority over Labour. The result was said to have been greeted by a large crowd.

Abercynon
Boundary Change. The Labour candidate had entered the fray at the last moment causing a three-cornered contest in this new ward.

Aberdare Town

Bargoed

Barry

Barry Dock

Blaengwawr
In a contest between two Liberals, John Howell, first elected in 1895, was defeated by Gwilym Treharne who had opposed him on several occasions in the past.

Bridgend
Randall was again returned unopposed, with the Liberals deciding not to oppose him.

Briton Ferry

Caeharris

Cadoxton

Caerphilly
Boundary Change. The previous Caerphilly division was divided.

Cilfynydd

Coedffranc

Coity

Cowbridge
The sitting member, a timber merchant at Pendoylan, who had captured the seat three years previously, was now returned unopposed.

Cwmavon
Henry Davies held on to the seat he won in 1907.

Cyfarthfa

Cymmer

Dinas Powys
The sitting member had held the seat for many years and was again returned.

Dowlais

Dulais Valley

Ferndale

Gadlys
Following the recent death of Griffith George, a fellow Liberal was elected in his place. There was no Labour candidate.

Garw Valley

Gellifaelog

Gelligaer

Glyncorrwg

Gower

Hengoed
In this new ward, long-serving alderman David Prosser was defeated.

Kibbor
Henry Lewis again returned after many years.

Llandaff
Robert Forrest held the seat comfortably.

Llandeilo Talybont
First elected in 1889, Rees Harries was again returned by a substantial majority.

Llansamlet

Llantrisant

Llwydcoed

Llwynypia and Clydach
James Evans, grocer, elected following Richard Lewis's election as alderman in 1901, was returned unopposed.

Loughor and Penderry
John Glasbrook was elected unopposed following the retirement of Sir John Llewelyn.

Maesteg, Caerau and Nantyffyllon
Vernon Hartshorn, miners; agent was returned by a huge majority

Maesteg, East and West
This was a repeat of the contest three years previously with the same result.

Margam
Following the retirement of the Liberal member, the son of the former Independent councillor, defeated in 1904, won a narrow victory over Labour.

Merthyr Town

Merthyr Vale

Morriston

Mountain Ash

Neath (North)

Neath (South)

Newcastle
T.J. Hughes, vice-chairman of the county council was returned unopposed.

Ogmore
The ward was renamed Porthcawl. In a close contest a prominent Liberal defeated the former Conservative councillor.

Ogmore Valley
Alderman William Llewellyn was again returned unopposed.

Oystermouth

Penarth North

Penarth South

Penrhiwceiber

Pentre
E.T. Davies, auctioneer, had been elected at a by-election following Elias Henry Davies's appointment as alderman in 1902. He was now returned unopposed.

Penydarren

Pontardawe

Plymouth

Pontlottyn

Pontypridd

Penygraig
Penygraig appears to be a new ward.

Porth

Resolven

Sketty

Swansea Valley

Treforest

Treherbert
Enoch Davies, returned in 1901 following William Morgan's re-election as alderman, was elected unopposed.

Treorchy
Thomas Jones, Co-operative stores manager, was returned unopposed.

Trealaw and Tonypandy
D.W. Davies, the member since 1898, was returned unopposed for the second successive election.

Tylorstown and Ynyshir
Sitting councillor Dr T.H. Morris stood down to allow Alderman W.H. Mathias to be returned unopposed.

Ystalyfera

Ystrad
Clifford Cory, the member since 1892, was once again returned unopposed.

Election of Aldermen

In addition to the 66 councillors the council consisted of 22 county aldermen. Boundary changes following the secession of Merthyr kept the number of councillors at 66 through the creation of additional wards. The number of aldermen therefore remained unchanged.  Aldermen were elected by the council, and served a six-year term. Following the 1910 election, there were twelve Aldermanic vacancies rather than eleven owing to the resignation of John Davies, an alderman elected for a Merthyr ward.

The following aldermen were appointed by the newly elected council.

elected for six years
Thomas, W. M. David
G. h- Fleming, 
Rhys 11 airies, 
Dd. Hughes 
G. J. Hughes, 
W. Jones, 
J. Jordan, 
Rhys Llew- ellyn, 
W. Llewellyn, 
W. H. Matthews, 
W. M. Williams, and 
Rev. D. H. Williams.

elected for three years

By-Elections

Aberdare Town by-election
William Thomas, High Constable of Miskin Higher, who had been nominated at the initial election but agreed to withdraw to prevent a split in the Liberal ranks was now returned unopposed.

Llwydcoed by-election
Harris, elected when Llewellyn was initially made an alderman, was again returned.

References

Bibliography

1910
1910 Welsh local elections
1910s in Glamorgan